National Highway 173 (NH 173), is a national highway in India. It originates in Mudigere, Karnataka, travels through Vastare, Chikkamagaluru, Sakrepatna, Kadur, Hosadurga terminating in Chitradurga .

See also
 List of National Highways in India
 National Highways Development Project
 List of National Highways in Karnataka

References

National highways in India
National Highways in Karnataka